OWS may refer to

 Occupy Wall Street, a political protest starting in 2011 that originated in New York City at Zucotti Park
 OGC Web Service Common, a standard of the Open Geospatial Consortium
 Oil–water separator, a device to separate oil and water
 Oily water separator, shipboard equipment
 Open water swimming, outdoor swimming in open lakes, rivers, and oceans
 Open Whisper Systems, a nonprofit open-source software group
 Open Window School, a private school located in Bellevue, Washington
 Operation Warp Speed, the United States national program to accelerate the development, manufacturing, and distribution of COVID-19 vaccines, therapeutics, and diagnostics.
 Opioid Withdrawal Syndrome
 Optional White Space (computer science), sometimes used when defining a grammar or protocol specification, see Metasyntax
 Order of World Scouts, the first international Scouting organisation
 Oritsé Williams, former member of JLS
 Overhead Weapon Station, a remote weapon station